There Existed an Addiction to Blood is the third studio album by American hip hop group clipping. It was released on October 18, 2019 through Sub Pop. It received mostly positive reviews from music critics.

Music and lyrics
Clipping described There Existed an Addiction to Blood in a press release as a "transmutation of horrorcore," continuing that it "absorbs the hyper-violent horror tropes of the Murder Dog era, but re-imagines them in a new light: still darkly-tinted and somber, but in a weirder and more vivid hue." Throughout the album, Daveed Diggs describes "gruesome movie scenarios," but, according to the Financial Times journalist Ludovic Hunter-Tilney, the lyrics do not contain the "sick [humor]" and misogyny associated with the genre. Diggs speaks in the second person in the tracks, which Tom Breihan of Stereogum interpreted to be in  order to do "everything he can to put us, the listeners, in the shoes of the victims."

The album title comes from the Sam Waymon song "The Blood of Thing (Part 2) Shadow of the Cross", written for the vampire film Ganja & Hess. This song is also sampled in "Blood of the Fang".

Critical reception

There Existed an Addiction to Blood received mostly positive reviews: aggregating website Metacritic reports a normalized rating of 73, based on 11 critical reviews. Paul Simpson of AllMusic described the album's "most exciting tracks" as "downright hallucinatory" and considered that Diggs' delivery is "precise and unflinching, detailing gruesome scenes with pinpoint accuracy." The Line of Best Fits Jack Bray hailed as "disheartening and sonically intriguing," adding that it "is yet another successful experiment for the group and one of the eeriest examples of modern hip-hop to date."

Track listing
All tracks are produced by Clipping.

Charts

References

2019 albums
Clipping. albums
Sub Pop albums
Horrorcore albums